Table tennis was contested at the 1962 Asian Games at the Istora Senayan in Jakarta, Indonesia, from 25 August 1962  to 31 August 1962.

Table tennis had team, doubles and singles events for men and women, as well as a mixed doubles competition.

Medalists

Medal table

References

 ITTF Database

External links
OCA official website

 
1962 Asian Games events
1962
Asian Games
1962 Asian Games